Sergei Viktorovich Starikov (born December 4, 1958) is a Russian ice hockey coach, who competed as defenseman for the Soviet national team.

Sergei Starikov won 9 national titles in the Soviet Union. Participating in 3 Olympic Tournaments, Sergei won 2 Gold and 1 Silver medal. He would appear on the cover of Sports Illustrated, becoming one of the first Soviet players to wear an NHL uniform when he joined the New Jersey Devils in 1989 along with his friend and defensive partner from the Soviet team, Viacheslav Fetisov. He made his NHL debut on October 5, 1989.

He lives in New Jersey and currently is an instructor at ProSkate Ice Rink.
Sergei currently coaches Barys of the KHL in Kazakhstan.
Sergei just signed a one-year deal to be an assistant coach with HC Sibir Novosibirsk, a Russian hockey team in the KHL.

Career statistics

Regular season and playoffs

International

External links

1958 births
Living people
HC CSKA Moscow players
Ice hockey players at the 1980 Winter Olympics
Ice hockey players at the 1984 Winter Olympics
Ice hockey players at the 1988 Winter Olympics
New Jersey Devils draft picks
New Jersey Devils players
Olympic gold medalists for the Soviet Union
Olympic ice hockey players of the Soviet Union
Olympic silver medalists for the Soviet Union
Russian ice hockey coaches
Russian ice hockey defencemen
San Diego Gulls (IHL) players
Soviet expatriate ice hockey players
Soviet expatriate sportspeople in the United States
Soviet ice hockey defencemen
Traktor Chelyabinsk players
Utica Devils players
Olympic medalists in ice hockey
Medalists at the 1984 Winter Olympics
Honoured Masters of Sport of the USSR
Medalists at the 1988 Winter Olympics
Medalists at the 1980 Winter Olympics